Echinometra is a genus of sea urchins in the family Echinometridae.

Species
The following species are listed in the World Echinoidea Database:

References

Echinometridae